Sumner Peter Mills III (born June 3, 1943) is an American politician from Maine. A Republican, Mills served in the Maine Senate, representing the 26th district. He ran for Governor of Maine in 2006 and 2010 and lost both times in the Republican primary. He is the older brother of the current Governor of Maine Janet Mills.

Early life and family
Mills was born in Farmington, Maine, the son of Katherine Louise (Coffin) and Sumner Peter Mills Jr., and grew up in Gorham. He graduated from Gorham High School in 1961. After graduating cum laude from Harvard College in 1965, he served five years on United States Navy destroyers with several duty tours in the Vietnam War, for which he was awarded the Navy Achievement Medal. He later conducted intelligence missions against the Soviet Union for which he was awarded the Navy Commendation Medal. Mills graduated second in his class from the University of Maine Law School in 1973.

Career 
Mills spent 32 years working as a lawyer in Maine. For 23 years, he has owned Wright & Mills in Skowhegan. He is a founding member of the Somerset Economic Development Corporation and a founding member of FirstPark, a business park in central Maine.

Naval service 
When he was a 17-year-old senior at Gorham High School, Mills was awarded a Navy scholarship to Harvard under the Holloway program.

On his third summer cruise in 1964, he was a midshipman aboard the destroyer USS Blue while serving on Yankee Station. The Blue and another destroyer were relieved by the Maddox and Turner Joy just before the famous Tonkin Gulf incident.

For five years of active duty, from July 1965 until July 1970, Mills had three tours of about 20 months each on the Dyess (DD 880), DESRON 2 staff aboard the Blandy (DD 943) and the McMorris (DE 1036).

On the Dyess he became the Communications Officer and qualified as OOD underway. The Dyess sailed from Newport around the world in order to serve on the Vietnam gunline, do plane guard duty on Yankee Station and patrol the Taiwan Straits. It fired 2787 rounds of 5′38 while on the gunline.

On Desron 2, Mills was the staff communications officer. From Norfolk, his squadron was sent through the Panama Canal to WestPac. For much of his time in the Western Pacific, his squadron staff commanded the gunline. While he was aboard the Blandy, the ship fired over 26,000 rounds of 5″54 which was a record for the gunline up to that time. They received return fire from the coast on occasion but without casualties.

For his last tour he was OPS boss and senior watch officer aboard the McMorris out of Pearl and was responsible for training junior officers in ship handling.

On one assignment, he was highly successful in collecting certain physical information about Soviet MRVs that was immediately released by the Nixon administration to support the ABM bill then pending in Congress. The bill still failed to pass.

Maine Legislature 
During 15 years in the Maine Legislature (most recently in the State Senate), he has served as a Republican lead on Tax, Labor, Judiciary, Appropriations, Education and Health & Human Services Committees. He was outspoken in advocating change in tax and school funding systems. He has worked with to pass reforms in health care and education.

In 1999 he led the Labor Committee to overhaul Maine's Unemployment Compensation system, to eliminate benefits, build reserves and reduce taxes. In 2005 he launched "Don't Mortgage ME," a petition drive to repeal a $447 million borrowing scheme. In 2009 the Legislature passed his bill to design a portable benefit system for new teachers and state employees. In 2008 the Legislature unanimously passed his Fund of Funds bill to attract venture capital for growing businesses. Governor John Baldacci vetoed the bill.

2006 gubernatorial campaign 
In 2005, Mills declared his candidacy for Governor in the 2006 election. In the Republican primary, he faced former U.S. Representative Dave Emery and State Senator Chandler Woodcock. Mills lost to Woodcock by 2,400 votes. Woodcock lost to incumbent Democrat John Baldacci in the November general election.

2010 gubernatorial campaign 
On July 22, 2009 Mills filed paperwork with the Maine Ethics Commission for entry into the 2010 Maine gubernatorial race. He was the fourth Republican to declare his candidacy, joined by Matt Jacobson, Les Otten, and Bruce Poliquin. Waterville mayor and businessperson Paul LePage was subsequently chosen to be the Republican candidate for Governor in 2010.

After the State Senate 
In 2011, Governor Paul LePage appointed Mills as the Executive Director of the Maine Turnpike Authority.

Personal life 
Mills' family is also involved in public service. His father served in the Maine legislature, in the Navy, and in the United States Department of Justice as U.S. Attorney. His sister, Janet Mills, was elected Maine Attorney General by the Legislature in December 2008. Janet currently serves as Governor of Maine, the state's first female governor. His sister Dora Mills was Maine's Public Health Director. His wife Nancy is a judge for the Cumberland County Superior Court. Her current seven-year term expires at the end of 2021.

He has three adult daughters and three grandchildren. Two of his daughters are educators. One serves in the United States Army.

Since leaving the legislature, Mills has practiced law and manages woodlots in Cornville where he lives with his wife, Superior Court Justice Nancy Mills.

Electoral history

References

External links
Official Website
Peter Mills Archives

1943 births
Living people
Harvard College alumni
People from Skowhegan, Maine
People from Farmington, Maine
Politicians from Gorham, Maine
Republican Party Maine state senators
21st-century American politicians
University of Maine School of Law alumni
20th-century American politicians
Candidates in the 2006 United States elections
Candidates in the 2010 United States elections
Gorham High School (Maine) alumni